Lichenopeltella cladoniarum is a species of fungus belonging to the class Dothideomycetes. It has been found growing on the podetia of Cladonia arbuscula in Bulgan district, Mongolia and Yamanashi prefecture in Japan.

References

Dothideomycetes
Fungi described in 1995
Fungi of Asia
Lichenicolous fungi